Posht Shiran (also Romanized as Posht Shīrān and Posht-e Shīrān; also known as Poshteh Shīrān) is a village in Derakhtengan Rural District, in the Central District of Kerman County, Kerman Province, Iran. At the 2006 census, its population was 159, in 46 families.

References 

Populated places in Kerman County